Kim Sherwood Anderson (born July 19, 1957) is a former American football safety in the National Football League. He was drafted by the Baltimore Colts in the third round of the 1979 NFL Draft.

Football experience 
He played college football at Pasadena City College and Arizona State.

He played his entire five seasons in the NFL with the Colts.

Honors and awards
In 1983, Kim recorded one interception for a touchdown, placing him tied for ninth place overall that year. Also that same year, he recorded the second longest interception return with seventy one yards.

Current life
Currently, Kim works as an Internet Marketing Consultant in Los Angeles.

References

1957 births
Living people
Players of American football from Pasadena, California
American football safeties
Arizona State Sun Devils football players
Baltimore Colts players
Indianapolis Colts players
Pasadena City Lancers football players